Zbigniew Pleśnierowicz (born 20 September 1958) is a Polish football goalkeeper.

References

1958 births
Living people
Polish footballers
Association football goalkeepers
Legia Warsaw players
Lech Poznań players
Warta Poznań players
Amica Wronki players
Polish expatriate footballers
Expatriate footballers in Sweden
Polish expatriate sportspeople in Sweden